The Uppsala–DLR Trojan Survey (UDTS, also known as UAO–DLR Trojan Survey) is an astronomical survey to study the movements and locations of asteroids near Jupiter, which includes Jupiter trojans and other asteroids, which line-of sight are frequently blocked by the giant planet.

The survey was carried out at the Uppsala Astronomical Observatory in Sweden, in collaboration with the German Aerospace Center (DLR). Principal investigators were the astronomers Claes-Ingvar Lagerkvist, Gerhard Hahn, Stefano Mottola, Magnus Lundström and Uri Carsenty. The Uppsala–DLR Trojan Survey, UDTS, should not be confused with its successor, the Uppsala-DLR Asteroid Survey (UDAS), which started shortly after the UDTS concluded.

During the course of the survey, two telescopes were used at ESO's La Silla site in northern Chile. In fall of 1996, the ESO Schmidt telescope surveyed approximately 900 deg2 at Jupiter's  Lagrangian point, location of the so-called Greek camp. Additional positions and magnitudes of asteroids were obtained using the (now decommissioned) 0.61-meter Bochum telescope.

There is some notable controversy over P/1997 T3, one of the objects found in this survey, namely an asteroid-like object with a comet-like tail. It is thought that this tail is composed of dust, due to its consistent appearance, and the fact that it is pointing towards the Sun, not away from it.

The group of Jupiter trojan contains about 6,000 asteroid. They are named after figures from Greek mythology, typically after the heroes of the Trojan War as narrated in Homer's Iliad.

List of discovered minor planets 

The Minor Planet Center credits the Uppsala–DLR Trojan Survey with the discovery of 62 numbered minor planets during 1996–1997.

See also 
 List of asteroid-discovering observatories
 
 Uppsala–ESO Survey of Asteroids and Comets, UESAC

References

External links 
 Comet or Asteroid?
 Trojans

Astronomical surveys
Asteroid surveys

Uppsala University